Cheng Chao-Hang (born 14 February 1977) is a Taiwanese baseball player who competed in the 2004 Summer Olympics.

References

1977 births
Living people
Baseball players at the 2004 Summer Olympics
Baseball third basemen
EDA Rhinos players
Olympic baseball players of Taiwan
People from Hualien County
Sinon Bulls players
Taiwanese baseball players
Fubon Guardians coaches
EDA Rhinos coaches